BIOGRAPHY
MUNTHALI CHRISTOPHER IS A SIMPLE GUY BORN IN A SMALL TOWN CALLED LUNSHYA ( LUANSHYA HOSPITAL ) IN 1999 ON THE 5TH OF MARCH HE STARTED IS EDUCATION JOURNEY AT KAFUBU  PRIMARY SCHOOL IN 2006 , IN 2007 HE FURTHER RELOCATED TO CHILILABOMBWE ON HIS  PARENTS DEMAND AND CONTINUE WITH HIS EDUCATION JOURNEY AT KONKOLA PRIMARY SCHOOL WERE HE FACED MANY OBSTACLES DUE TO THAT FACT THAT HE WAS A NEW KID IN CLASS AND WAS NOT ABLE TO CONCUR UP WITH THE CLASS AND THE COMMUNITY'S STANDARDS THOUGH HE FACED ALL THIS HE REMAINED FOCUSED AND DETERMINED TILL HE WROTE HIS G7 EXAMS 2007 AND CLEARED WITH FLYING COLORS AND REPORTED BACK TO KONKOLA PRIMARY SCH FOR FURTHERING HIS STUDIES AS A G8, STARTED AGAIN AND WAS INTRODUCED TO NEW COURSES NEW TUTOR'S NEW FRIENDS BUT ALL IN ALL HE FAULT AGAINST ALL ODDS AND STILL MADE IT AND CLEARED THE G9 WITH GOOD RESULTS, HE FURTHER JOINED KAMENZA SECONDARY SCH FOR HIS FINAL RACE, IT WAS THIS TIME WERE HE DISCOVERED HIS LIKES AND DISLIKES ASWEL AS HIS PASSION, HE FURTHER UNDERSTOOD THAT WAS GOOD 
AT COMPUTER PROGRAMING (SOFTWARE PROGRAMMING )( WEBSITE MANAGING AND CREATION)( TECHNICIAN AND ELECTRICIAN)(BUSINESS GUINNESS) LIKE WISE HE WROTE THE G12 EXAMS AND PASSED WITH A MERIT GRADE IN 2017 HE STAYED IN SOCIETY FOR A YEAR AND  DISCOVERED ANOTHER PART OF HIS LIFE AS A MUSIC INSTRUMENTS PLAYER,
HE THEN JOINED EDEN UNIVERSITY IN 2019 UNDER CLINICAL MEDICINE WHICH TOOK HIM THREE YEARS AND COMPLETED IN 2021 AS A DIPLOMA CERTIFICATE HOLDER IN THE VERY YEAR OF 2021 HE JOINED BIG TREE BEVERAGES AS A CASUAL AND WAS LATER PROMOTED TO AN OPERATOR AND MATE FRIENDS WHO BECAME FAMILY ( MOSES PHIRI) (CACIOUS MULAMBYA) ( YOTAM PHIRI) ( VINCENT KASONGO) CAN LINE TWO .

External links 
 
 
 
 

1991 births
Living people
Zambian footballers
Zambian expatriate footballers
Zambia international footballers
Nkana F.C. players
Akhaa Ahli Aley FC players
Power Dynamos F.C. players
Buildcon F.C. players
Lebanese Premier League players
2015 Africa Cup of Nations players
Association football defenders
Zambian expatriate sportspeople in Lebanon
Expatriate footballers in Lebanon
Zambia A' international footballers
2016 African Nations Championship players